The Khirai railway station in the Indian state of West Bengal, serves Khirai in Purba Medinipur district. It is on the Howrah–Kharagpur line.

History
Khirai railway station is situated in Meghadangar, West Bengal. Station code is KHAI. It is a small railway station between Howrah and Kharagpur. Local EMU trains Howrah–Balichak, Howrah–Kharagpur, Santragachi–Kharagpur local, Howrah–Kharagpur local stop here. The Howrah–Kharagpur line was opened in 1900. The Howrah–Kharagpur stretch has three lines. There is a plan to build a fourth line for the Santragachi–Panskura–Kharagpur stretch.
The Howrah–Kharagpur line was electrified in 1967–69.

References

External links
Trains at Khirai

Railway stations in Purba Medinipur district
Kolkata Suburban Railway stations